Anton Yashkov (born 30 January 1992) is a professional Ukrainian football goalkeeper who plays for Polissya Zhytomyr.

Yashkov is the product of the UOR Donetsk, Shakhtar Donetsk Youth and Metalurh Donetsk Youth School Systems.

He made his debut for FC Hoverla played full-time against FC Olimpik Donetsk on 2 May 2012 in Ukrainian First League.

References

External links

1992 births
Living people
People from Bilozerske
Ukrainian footballers
FC Hoverla Uzhhorod players
FC Bukovyna Chernivtsi players
FC Kolos Kovalivka players
FC Polissya Zhytomyr players
Ukrainian Premier League players
Ukrainian First League players
Ukrainian Second League players
Association football goalkeepers
Sportspeople from Donetsk Oblast